Talteliyeh (also Romanized as Taltelīyeh, Tel Telia, and Toltolīyeh; also known as Maehamia) is a village in Abdoliyeh-ye Gharbi Rural District, in the Central District of Ramshir County, Khuzestan Province, Iran. At the 2006 census, its population was 239, in 40 families.

References 

Populated places in Ramshir County